The 2016–17 Marshall Thundering Herd women's basketball team represented the Marshall University during the 2016–17 NCAA Division I women's basketball season. The Thundering Herd, led by fourth year head coach Matt Daniel, played their home games at the Cam Henderson Center and were members of Conference USA. They finished the season 13–17, 5–13 for in C-USA play to finish in a tie for 11th place. They lost in the first round of the C-USA women's tournament to Charlotte.

Roster

Rankings

Schedule

|-
!colspan=9 style="background:#009B48; color:#FFFFFF;"| Non-conference regular season

|-
!colspan=9 style="background:#009B48; color:#FFFFFF;"| Conference USA regular season

|-
!colspan=9 style="background:#009B48; color:#FFFFFF;"| Conference USA Women's Tournament

See also
2016–17 Marshall Thundering Herd men's basketball team

References

Marshall Thundering Herd women's basketball seasons
Marshall
Marsh
Marsh